A Bola TV is a Portuguese basic fiber and satellite television channel. It's a sports channel owned by the same company that owns the Portuguese sport newspaper A Bola, read in Portugal, the Portuguese diaspora and in Portuguese-speaking Africa. The content is mostly about football, but have many other sports, even some F1 shows.

The channel appeared after an agreement between Sociedade Vicra Desportiva and MEO and it had an exclusivity contract with that platform. While limited in Portugal, it's widely available in Africa.

Broadcasting rights

Football
 Campeonato de Portugal Prio
 Hero I league
 A Lyga

Futsal
 LNFS

Handball
 Andebol 1 (Except Benfica, Sporting and FC Porto's home matches)

Basketball
 Liga Portuguesa de Basquetebol

References

Television stations in Portugal
Television channels and stations established in 2012
2012 establishments in Portugal